Gorczyce  is a village in the administrative district of Gmina Prostki, within Ełk County, Warmian-Masurian Voivodeship, in northern Poland.

Before 1945 the area was part of East Prussia.

The village has an approximate population of 110.

References

Villages in Ełk County